Saiichi (written: 才一 or 栽一) is a masculine Japanese given name. Notable people with the name include:

 (1925–2012), Japanese writer and literary critic
Saiichi Sugiyama (杉山 栽一) (born 1960), British-based Japanese musician/composer and lawyer

Japanese masculine given names